Vous et Nous is the ninth album by experimental pop French musician Brigitte Fontaine and the seventh by Areski Belkacem, released in 1977 on the Saravah label. Vous et Nous is an avant-garde double album mixing a variety of instruments and vocal styles. The album uses synthesizer and drum machine on some songs. Other, more acoustic, songs show the Algerian/African influence that Fontaine and Areski were known for. The album was not well understood upon release, but in later years was championed by musicians such as Jim O'Rourke and Stereolab.

Track listing

References 

Brigitte Fontaine albums
Areski Belkacem albums
1977 albums